KPS may refer to:

Organizations
 Communist Party of Slovenia
 Communist Party of Switzerland
 Evangelical Church of the Church Province of Saxony (Evangelische Kirche der Kirchenprovinz Sachsen)(1950–2009) 
 Korean Physical Society
 KPS Capital Partners, an American investment company
 KPS Video Express, a defunct Hong Kong video rental company
 Korea Plant Service & Engineering

Other uses
 Karnofsky performance status, in medicine
 Keratic precipitate, a disease
 Kilometres per second; see metre per second
 KPS Chemik Police, a Polish volleyball club
 Potassium persulfate
 Korean Positioning System
 Kempsey Airport, IATA airport code "KPS"